The 1962–63 Segunda División season was the 32nd since its establishment and was played between 16 September 1962 and 21 April 1963.

Overview before the season
32 teams joined the league, including 4 relegated from the 1961–62 La Liga and 5 promoted from the 1961–62 Tercera División.

Relegated from La Liga
Español
Real Santander
Real Sociedad
Tenerife

Promoted from Tercera División

Langreo
Constancia
Eldense
Sevilla Atlético
Melilla

Group North

Teams

League table

Top goalscorers

Top goalkeepers

Results

Group South

Teams

League table

Top goalscorers

Top goalkeepers

Results

Promotion playoffs

First leg

Second leg

Tiebreaker

Relegation playoffs

First leg

Second leg

Tiebreaker

External links
BDFútbol

Segunda División seasons
2
Spain